Thomas Garaklidis (born 23 May 1989) is a professional Greek football player.

Career
Born in Giannitsa, Garaklidis started his professional career with Mavroi Aetoi Paralimnis, from which he moved on to Delta Ethniki clubs Edessaikos and Niki Polygyros. He then played for fellow Delta Ethniki side Evros Soufli in 2010, before making a leap in his career by moving to Superleague side Doxa Drama on 28 January 2012. He played in eight Superleague games with the "black eagles" before the club was relegated at the end of the season. He left Drama in January 2013, signing with his hometown club Anagennisi Giannitsa for six months, and with Nea Kavala in the summer of 2013, where he received substantially more playing time. He returned to Doxa Drama in 2015, where he stayed for 1,5 years.

In December 2016, Garaklidis signed with Cretan side Ergotelis in the Gamma Ethniki.

References

External links
Doxa Drama squad at uefa.com

1989 births
Living people
Doxa Drama F.C. players
Kavala F.C. players
Ergotelis F.C. players
Super League Greece players
Greek footballers
Association football defenders
Footballers from Giannitsa
21st-century Greek people